Montepulciano Stazione is a town in Tuscany, central Italy, administratively a frazione of the comune of Montepulciano, province of Siena. At the time of the 2001 census its population was 1,507.

Montepulciano Stazione is about 66 km from Siena and 8 km from Montepulciano.

References 

Frazioni of Montepulciano
Railway towns in Italy